Deschloroclotizolam is a thienotriazolodiazepine derivative which has been sold as a designer drug, first being identified in Sweden in 2021.

See also
 Alprazolam
 Clotizolam
 Fluclotizolam
 Deschloroetizolam

References

Designer drugs
GABAA receptor positive allosteric modulators
Thienotriazolodiazepines
Chloroarenes
Phenyl compounds